Volleyball events were contested at the 1995 Summer Universiade in Fukuoka, Japan.

References
 Universiade volleyball medalists on HickokSports

Universaiie
1995 Summer Universiade
1995